Ian Bryant (born 11 June 1942) is a former Australian rules footballer who played with Footscray in the VFL during the 1960s. 

Bryant played mostly in the back pocket but was also used on the wing. He played in Footscray's losing 1961 grand final side. In 1966 he finished 9th in the Brownlow Medal count and was selected to play for Victoria at the Hobart Carnival where he earned All Australian selection.

External links

1942 births
Australian rules footballers from Victoria (Australia)
Western Bulldogs players
Geelong West Football Club players
All-Australians (1953–1988)
Living people